Vernon Jubilee Hospital (VJH) is a hospital located in Vernon, British Columbia, a city in the Okanagan region of Canada. Initial examination for constructing a hospital in Vernon began in 1895, when residents of the city demanded a hospital to be created. It was ultimately incorporated in 1897 and serves the North Okanagan regional district. The Vernon Jubilee Hospital offers core physician specialty, and emergency departments, in addition to acute and obstetrical care. This facility is home to 148 beds, although people who would like services that are not offered at the hospital are transferred to the Kelowna General Hospital, which is located in nearby city Kelowna. There has been consideration for more beds to be offered at the hospital.

The addition of 60 beds and the completion of the sixth and seventh floor at Vernon Jubilee Hospital Polson Tower, originally set aside, with future patient needs in mind.
 
Of the 60 beds, 14 will be new and the remaining 46 will be relocated from elsewhere in the hospital. The beds will be used primarily for single-patient rooms. Previously, they were located in four-bed and double-occupancy wards. The total number of beds at the Vernon Jubilee Hospital will increase from 140 regular and eight temporary beds (148 total) to 162 beds. 
Completed as part of the Kelowna / Vernon Hospitals Project, the Polson Tower includes an expanded emergency, maternity and pediatrics department, ambulatory care, surgical services, intensive care, and medical device reprocessing. The Polson Tower was also recently awarded a LEED Gold certification and is the first building in Vernon to achieve this. 
The Polson Tower was officially opened for patients in October 2011. The $180-million Polson Tower added 16,815 square metres (181,000 square feet) of space to the Vernon Jubilee Hospital site.

References

External links 
 
 Production website

Hospital buildings completed in 1897
Hospitals in the Okanagan
Vernon, British Columbia
Hospitals established in 1897